Acronicta cinerea is a moth of the family Noctuidae. It is found from northern Germany, Poland, Slovakia, the Czech Republic, the Baltic, Norway, southern Finland, Belarus, Ukraine, western Russia up to Uralsk and Guberli.

Some authors consider Acronicta cinerea a synonym of Acronicta euphorbiae

References

External links 
 Discussion about status of taxon
 Fauna Europaea

Acronicta
Moths of Europe
Moths described in 1766
Taxa named by Johann Siegfried Hufnagel